Cobitis striata is a species of fish in the family Cobitidae found in the rivers flowing into the Seto Inland Sea in Honshu, Shikoku, and Kyushu, and rivers flowing into the Japan Sea in Honshu: Kyoto, Osaka, Wakayama, Hyōgo, Okayama, Hiroshima, Yamaguchi, Kagawa, Tokushima, Ehime, and Fukuoka Prefectures in Japan.

Subspecies
There are currently 3 recognized subspecies:
 Cobitis striata fuchigamii Nakajima, 2012 
 Cobitis striata hakataensis Nakajima, 2012 
 Cobitis striata striata Ikeda, 1936

References

Fish described in 1936
Endemic fauna of Japan
striata